Foswhitt  Jer'ald "Fozzy" Whittaker (born February 2, 1989) is a former American football running back and kick returner. He played college football at Texas. He is from Pearland, Texas.

Early years
Whittaker attended and played high school football at Pearland High School.

College career

Whittaker played college football at the University of Texas from 2008–2011. In the 2008 season, he had 64 carries for 284 rushing yards in seven games. In the 2009 season, he had 53 carries for 212 rushing yards and four rushing touchdowns in 11 games. In the 2010 season, he had 80 carries for 351 rushing yards and four rushing touchdowns. In the 2011 season, he had 66 carries for 386 rushing yards and six rushing touchdowns.

Professional career

Arizona Cardinals
On December 18, 2012, Whittaker signed with the Arizona Cardinals to join their practice squad. On March 11, 2013, he was released by the Cardinals.

San Diego Chargers
On March 12, 2013, Whittaker was claimed off waivers by the San Diego Chargers. He made his NFL debut on September 9, 2013, against the Houston Texans. He played in three total games with the Chargers in the 2013 season. On September 28, he was released by the Chargers.

Cleveland Browns
On September 30, 2013, Whittaker was claimed off waivers by the Cleveland Browns. On October 27, against the Kansas City Chiefs, he scored his first professional touchdown. With the Chargers and Browns in the 2013 season, he had 28 carries for 79 rushing yards to go along with 21 receptions for 155 receiving yards and two receiving touchdowns. On May 12, 2014, Whittaker was released by the Cleveland Browns.

Carolina Panthers
On July 27, 2014, Whittaker was signed by the Carolina Panthers after an injury to Panthers rookie running back Tyler Gaffney that occurred the previous day. After a strong preseason showing, he made the initial 53-man roster, announced on August 30, 2014. In the 2014 regular season, he finished with 32 carries for 145 rushing yards and a rushing touchdown to go along with five receptions for 60 receiving yards and a receiving touchdown. On January 3, 2015, in the Wild Card Round of the playoffs, Whittaker scored a crucial 39-yard, go-ahead receiving touchdown in the third quarter against the Arizona Cardinals, helping the Panthers to a 27–16 victory which enabled them to advance to the Divisional Round of the playoffs, where the Panthers' season ended in a 31–17 loss to the Seattle Seahawks. In Whittaker's second year with the team, he had 108 rushing yards and a rushing touchdown as the Panthers finished the season with a franchise-record 15 wins. In the first two rounds of the playoffs, they defeated the Seattle Seahawks in the Divisional Round and the Arizona Cardinals in the NFC Championship. On February 7, 2016, Whittaker was part of the Panthers team that played in Super Bowl 50. In the game, Whittaker had four carries for 26 yards, one catch for 14 yards, and two tackles on special teams, but the Panthers fell to the Denver Broncos by a score of 24–10.

In the 2016 season, Whittaker would appear in all 16 regular season games. He had 57 carries for 265 yards and 25 receptions for 226 yards.

On September 18, 2016, Whittaker ran for 100 yards on 16 carries against the San Francisco 49ers when Jonathan Stewart left in the first quarter with a hamstring injury. On October 2, he caught nine passes for 86 yards against the Atlanta Falcons.

On March 8, 2017, Whittaker signed a two-year contract extension. In the 2017 season, he finished with seven carries for 18 rushing yards to go along with five receptions for 47 receiving yards and a receiving touchdown.

On May 10, 2018, Whittaker suffered a torn ACL during a non-contact drill in the off-season. As a result, he was placed on injured reserve and ruled out for the entire 2018 season.

Personal life 
Whittaker was raised by parents Foster Jer'ald Whittaker and Gloria Whittaker. His father died from lymphoma in 1992.

References

External links

Texas Longhorns bio

1989 births
Living people
American football running backs
Texas Longhorns football players
Arizona Cardinals players
San Diego Chargers players
Cleveland Browns players
Carolina Panthers players
Players of American football from Houston
Pearland High School alumni